This is a list of results for the Legislative Council at the 1999 New South Wales state election.

This was the so-called "Tablecoth election" due to the large size of the ballots used.

A record 264 candidates ran in this election. Even more would run in each succeeding election.

Results

Continuing members 

The following MLCs were not up for re-election this year.

See also
 Results of the 1999 New South Wales state election (Legislative Assembly)
 Candidates of the 1999 New South Wales state election
 Members of the New South Wales Legislative Council, 1999–2003

References

1999 Legislative Council